The Huye Stadium is a multi-use stadium in Butare, Rwanda. It is currently used mostly for football matches and is the home ground of Mukura Victory Sports FC. The stadium holds 10,000 people.

References 

Buildings and structures in Butare
Huye